Ivo Héctor Cerda Woldarsky (born 31 October 1995), known as Ivo Cerda, is a Chilean footballer.

Career
Cerda played as a midfielder for Lansing Ignite FC of USL League One in 2019. The club ceased operations after its inaugural 2019 season.

Personal
In May 2021, Cerda was named one of two recipients of the NCAA's prestigious Walter Byers Graduate Scholarship.

References

External links
 
 Profile at University of Michigan Athletics

1995 births
Living people
Chilean footballers
Chilean expatriate footballers
Chilean expatriate sportspeople in the United States
Association football midfielders
Chicago FC United players
Expatriate soccer players in the United States
Lansing Ignite FC players
Flint City Bucks players
Michigan Wolverines men's soccer players
Footballers from Santiago
USL League One players
USL League Two players